Abdulelah Sharyan (Arabic: عبدالاله شريان ) (born 11 January 1986) is a Yemeni football forward. He was a member of the Yemen national under-17 football team and played for Yemen at the 2003 FIFA U-17 World Championship in Finland.

Honours

Club
Al-Oruba'

Yemeni League: 1
 2010–11
Yemeni Super Cup: 1
 2011

Country
Yemen U17
FIFA U-17 World Cup
Group Stage: 2003
 AFC U-17 Championship
Runner-up: 2002 AFC U-17 Championship

International goals

External links 
 

1986 births
Living people
Yemeni footballers
Yemen international footballers
Association football forwards
Al-Oruba (Yemeni) players
Al-Shula players
Al-Saqr SC players
Al-Wehda Club (Sana'a) players
May 22 San'a players
Yemeni League players